Tonny Maringgi (10 June 1959 – 15 September 2019) was an Indonesian table tennis player. He competed in the men's singles event at the 1988 Summer Olympics.

References

External links
 

1959 births
2019 deaths
Indonesian male table tennis players
Olympic table tennis players of Indonesia
Table tennis players at the 1988 Summer Olympics
People from Kendari
20th-century Indonesian people